The Quasar 2000 is a series of Czech high-wing, single-place, hang gliders that was designed and produced by Quasar of Dolní Bečva. Now out of production, when the series was available the models were each supplied complete and ready-to-fly.

Design and development
The 2000 is made from aluminum tubing, with the double-surface wing covered in Dacron sailcloth. The nose angle for all models is 132°. The models are each named for their wing area in square metres.

Variants
2000 13
Small-sized model for lighter pilots. Its  span wing is cable braced from a single kingpost.
2000 13.6
Mid-sized model for mid-weight pilots. Its  span wing is cable braced from a single kingpost.
2000 14.8
Large-sized model for heavier pilots. Its  span wing is cable braced from a single kingpost.

Specifications (2000 14.8)

References

2000
Hang gliders